Angola competed at the 1996 Summer Paralympics in Atlanta, United States. It was the country's first ever participation at the Paralympic Games, as the lengthy Angolan Civil War continued. It was represented by two athletes, who both competed in men's track and field events, without winning a medal.

Team 
Angola made their Paralympic game debut in Atlanta, sending 2 athletes, both men.  Their participation took place, even as the lengthy Angolan Civil War continued.  The team members were Angelo Londaca  and Vasco da Fonseca.

Full results
Angelo Londaca competed in the 100 and 200 metre sprints in the T10 category for entirely blind athletes. In the former, he finished sixth out of seven in his heat, and did not advance ; in the latter, he was disqualified during the heat. Vasco da Fonseca, in disability category 44, took part in the men's 100 metres, finishing last in his heat, and in the long jump, finishing fourteenth out of seventeen.

See also
Angola at the Paralympics
Angola at the 1996 Summer Olympics

External links
International Paralympic Committee

References 

Nations at the 1996 Summer Paralympics
1996
Summer Paralympics